Phaea mariae is a species of beetle in the family Cerambycidae. It was described by Chemsak in 1999. It is known from Guatemala.

References

mariae
Beetles described in 1999